The common cockle (Cerastoderma edule) is a species of edible saltwater clam, a marine bivalve mollusc in the family Cardiidae, the cockles. It is found in waters off Europe, from Iceland in the north, south into waters off western Africa as far south as Senegal. The common cockle is harvested commercially and eaten in much of its range.

Taxonomy and naming

The common cockle was one of the many invertebrate species originally described by Carl Linnaeus in the landmark 1758 10th edition of Systema Naturae, where it was given its old binomial name Cardium edule. The species name is derived from the Latin adjective ĕdūlis "edible". Italian naturalist Giuseppe Saverio Poli erected the genus Cerastoderma in 1795, making the common cockle the type species as Cerastoderma edule. The genus name is derived from the Ancient Greek words keras "horn" and derma "skin". For many years it was referred to by both names.

Other common names in English are edible cockle and common edible cockle. On account of its heart-like shape, it is called the "heart mussel" in German and Scandinavian languages (Hertzmuschel and Hjertemusling, respectively).

Description
The shells are pale or whitish yellow, grubby white, or brown. The shell is oval, and covered by ribs, which are flattened in the middle part of the shell. The digestive glands are light brown to dark green.

In contrast, the similar lagoon cockle has an elongated shell posteriorly, black digestive glands and is found in substrate of stagnant water.

Distribution and habitat
This species is found in coastal areas of the northern and eastern Atlantic Ocean. It is widely distributed from Iceland and Norway in Europe, to Senegal along the coast of west Africa. The common cockle is one of the most abundant species of molluscs in tidal flats located in the bays and estuaries of Europe. It plays a major role as a source of food for crustaceans, fish, and wading birds.

<div align=center>
Cerastoderma edule edule
Right and left valve of the same specimen:

Cerastoderma edule belgicum
Right and left valve of the same specimen:

Cerastoderma edule maculatum
Right and left valve:

</div align=center>

Ecology
This species is a filter feeder, meaning that it feeds by straining water to obtain suspended matter and food particles.  Water is inhaled through an inhalant siphon, and exhaled through an exhalant siphon.

It tolerates a wide range of salinity (euryhaline), and wide range of temperatures (eurythermic), which helps to explain its very extensive range.  It has a first spawning period in early summer, and a second one in the fall.  Lifespan is typically five to six years, though it may perish earlier due to predation by humans as well as crabs, flounder, and various birds especially including oystercatchers. A green shore crab (Carcinus maenas) can consume up to 40 common cockles a day, eating smaller cockles (under 1.5 cm diameter) much more quickly than larger ones. Hence they could have a greater impact in lean seasons where cockles did not grow so quickly.

Parasites and diseases
The cercozoan species Marteilia cochillia is a parasite of the common cockle, having caused a collapse in commercial harvests of cockle beds in Galicia in 2012.
 A survey of cockle beds in Galicia found that infestation by the gregarine parasite Nematopsis was widespread, and that the most common pathological finding was disseminated neoplasia.

Uses
These animals were probably a significant food source in hunter-gatherer societies of prehistoric Europe, and the clay remains of shell-imprints have been found.  The clay is imprinted with fine decorations, repetitions of the distinct curved ridges, undulating lines and/or edges characteristic to the cockle shell, a natural resource of coastal waters.

Cardial ware is the name of the Neolithic pottery from maritime cultures that colonized Mediterranean shores c. 6000 – 5,500 BC, this name being based upon the old binomial name of the species: Cardium edule.

In the 1800s, a song called "Molly Malone" was first published (also known as "Cockles and Mussels"), later becoming the unofficial song of Dublin, Ireland.  The lyrics describe Molly Malone selling the common cockle in the streets of that city.

As food

This cockle is cooked and eaten in several countries (including the United Kingdom, France, Germany, Ireland, Japan, Portugal and Spain).  It is also sometimes eaten pickled, or raw.

An important species for the fishing industry, it is commercially fished in the United Kingdom, Ireland and France by suction dredge and also raking by hand.  Previously the greatest catch was from the Netherlands, but now fisheries restrictions have been put in place due to environmental concerns.  Similar measures have been established elsewhere, for example in Scotland where dredging with vehicles is prohibited, and in parts of England and Wales where only old-fashioned hand-gathering is permitted (using a long plank that is rocked back and forth on the sand).

This species is also used in aquaculture.  Farming of cockles is ongoing in the UK, the Netherlands and Portugal.  However, production in those countries has not been very stable; for example, production fell from 107,800 tons in 1987 to 40,900 tons in 1997.  In addition to being a food source, their shells have also been used industrially as a source of lime.

Gathering this species can be dangerous.  In 2004, the incoming tide at Morecambe Bay in England caused 23 cockle-gatherers to die.

References

External links
 

Cardiidae
Commercial molluscs
Molluscs described in 1758
Taxa named by Carl Linnaeus
Molluscs of the Atlantic Ocean
Molluscs of the Mediterranean Sea
Molluscs of the Black Sea
Marine molluscs of Europe
Bivalves of Europe
Marine molluscs of Africa